"Sexy Girl" is a song by an American musician, singer and songwriter Glenn Frey. It was released as the lead single from his 1984 album The Allnighter.

Chart performance
"Sexy Girl" was a moderate success, peaking at number 20 on the Billboard Hot 100 in August 1984. The song also became a minor hit in Australia and Canada.

Music video

The video features a cameo appearance by then Los Angeles Raiders defensive end Howie Long.

Track listings
7" single
 "Sexy Girl" 3:30	
 "Better in the U.S.A." 3:00

Personnel
 Glenn Frey – lead and backing vocals, electric guitar, bass
 Barry Beckett – synthesizers, acoustic piano 
 Duncan Cameron – harmony vocals, lead guitar
 Larrie Londin – drums
 Roy Galloway – backing vocals
 Jack Tempchin – backing vocals
 Luther Waters – backing vocals 
 Oren Waters – backing vocals

Charts

References

1984 singles
Glenn Frey songs
MCA Records singles
Songs written by Jack Tempchin
1984 songs
Songs written by Glenn Frey